Pong Tam is a tambon (subdistrict) of Chai Prakan District, in Chiang Mai Province, Thailand. In 2016 it had a population of 8,087 people.

History
Pong Tam was originally a subdistrict of Fang District. On 1 January 1988 it was one of four subdistricts split off from Fang to form Chai Prakan District.

Administration

Central administration
The tambon is divided into eight administrative villages (mubans).

Local administration
The subdistrict is covered by the subdistrict municipality (thesaban tambon) Chai Prakan (เทศบาลตำบลไชยปราการ).

References

External links
Thaitambon.com on Pong Tam

Tambon of Chiang Mai province
Populated places in Chiang Mai province